Kalafat or Kurilovo is a mountain located in a southeastern Serbia.

Location 
It is derived from the translation of the Gramada in the east, to the passage of Turin to the west, from where the Popova glava begins. In the south it is limited by the Niš valley, and in the north by the Toponica and Kopajkosarsko rivers. On the comparative axis it extends 15 km, and on the meridian 11 km, between the villages of Gornji Matejevac and Popsica. Kalafat from the south is surrounded by the city of Niš and the villages of Kamenica, Matejevac and Knez Selo, and from the north of the villages of Grbavče, Kopajkosara and Cerje.

Peaks 
Its highest peak is Kalafat (837 m). There are two more peaks beyond 800 m, and 10 beyond 700 m.

References 

Balkan mountains
Mountains of Serbia
Balkans